Trafford Housing Trust is a housing association based in Trafford. It owns and manages about 9000 properties.  It also provides care and support for disabled people and runs sheltered housing and extra-care homes.  It owns Laurus Homes, which builds affordable homes for sale. It was created by a transfer of housing stock from Trafford Council in 2005.

Commercial details
Matthew Gardiner is the chief executive. Turnover for 2016/7 was £54.4 million, with an operating surplus of £12.4 million.  In 2017 it completed a refinancing package of £275 million from Lloyds Bank, BlackRock, the Pension Insurance Corporation and the Yorkshire Building Society.  It also has funding from the Greater Manchester Housing Investment Fund.

It has set up a joint venture with Galliford Try to build homes in Partington next to Carrington Moss. About 500 will be sold and 74 will be available for shared ownership or affordable rent.

In 2019, L&Q acquired THT.

Community work
It set up the award-winning Limelight centre in Old Trafford in 2017.

In 2018 it was part of a scheme with Great Places Housing Group, Trafford Council, and Irwell Valley Homes to turn unoccupied office space into night shelters for homeless people and donated £5,000 for essential items.

References

Organisations based in Trafford
Housing associations based in England